Okapa may refer to:

Geography
Okapa District, Papua New Guinea
East Okapa Rural LLG, Papua New Guinea
West Okapa Rural LLG, Papua New Guinea

Biology 
Kaveinga okapa, a groundbeetle
 Okapa (wasp), a genus of wasps in the family Platygastridae